Calton (Ward 9) is one of the 23 wards of Glasgow City Council. On its creation in 2007 and in 2012 it returned three council members, using the single transferable vote system. For the 2017 Glasgow City Council election, the seats increased to four due to the population having risen by 20% since it was first formed, although the boundaries did not change.

Boundaries
Located south-east of Glasgow city centre - the western boundary being High Street - and immediately north of the River Clyde, the ward includes the historic Calton area and the new Collegelands development as well as the neighbourhoods of Bridgeton, Dalmarnock (with the 2014 Commonwealth Games Athletes' Village, converted to residential homes), Gallowgate, Barrowfield, Newbank, Lilybank (to Maukinfauld Road), most of Parkhead (excluding parts north of Tollcross Road) and a small part of Dennistoun (the Reidvale streets between Duke Street and the North Clyde Line railway).

The ethnic makeup of the Calton ward using the 2011 census population statistics was:

90% White Scottish / British / Irish / Other
5.4% Asian (mainly Chinese)
3.6% Black (mainly African)
1% Mixed / Other Ethnic Group

Councillors

Election results

2022 election
2022 Glasgow City Council election

2017 election
2017 Glasgow City Council election

2012 election
2012 Glasgow City Council election

2015 by-election
On 14 May 2015 SNP counsellor Alison Thewliss resigned her seat after having been elected as an MP for the constituency of Glasgow Central. A by-election was held on 6 August 2015 and was won by the SNP's Greg Hepburn.

2007 election
2007 Glasgow City Council election

See also
Wards of Glasgow

References

External links
Listed Buildings in Calton Ward, Glasgow City at British Listed Buildings

Wards of Glasgow
Bridgeton–Calton–Dalmarnock